La Horqueta, also known as Paso de la Horqueta, is a small new populated centre in the Colonia Department of southwestern Uruguay.

Geography
It is located west of Río San Juan and east of Miguelete Creek. Routes 21 and 106 intersect Route 22 in this area east of a bridge over Arroyo Miguelete called Paso del Pelado.  north of it, along Route 21, is a bridge over Río San Juan called Paso de la Horqueta, which gives the name to the area. There is an old abandoned church just north of the bridge.

Information 
La Horqueta has two primary and secondary schools, one of which is private. Animal husbandry is the main industrial activity of the village, followed closely by agriculture and milk production.

In the Google satellite image of 15 May 2007 there are only fields with no structure of streets, where four blocks of newly built houses appear in the satellite image of 8 October 2009.

Population 
La Horqueta appeared first as a populated centre in the 2011 census and had a population of 100.

Organizations named after this area
There is an athletic club based in Tarariras called Club La Horqueta Wánderers, which has a football team, the Horqueta Wánderers F.C. and a racing car track called Autódromo Pilón Banchero or Autodromo Juan A. Schnyder.

References

External links
INE map of La Horqueta

Populated places in the Colonia Department